Kaohly Her (born 1972/1973) is an American politician serving in the Minnesota House of Representatives since 2019. A member of the Minnesota Democratic–Farmer–Labor Party (DFL), Her represents District 64A, which includes parts of Saint Paul in Ramsey County, Minnesota.

Early life, education, and career
Her was born in Laos and came to the U.S. as a Hmong refugee. Hmong was her first language. She grew up in Appleton, Wisconsin.

Her attended the University of Wisconsin–Madison, graduating with a Bachelor of Business Administration; the University of St. Thomas, studying education leadership; and Northeastern University, graduating with a Master of Business Administration in international management.

Her was a policy director for Saint Paul Mayor Melvin Carter.

In 2016, Her co-founded Maiv-PAC, a nonpartisan Hmong political action committee.

Minnesota House of Representatives
Her was elected to the Minnesota House of Representatives in 2018, after DFL incumbent Erin Murphy retired to run for governor of Minnesota, and has been reelected every two years since.

Her served as majority whip of the Minnesota House of Representatives in 2021-22. She was the first Hmong-American woman to hold a leadership position in the House. Her serves on the Health Finance and Policy, Legacy Finance, and State and Local Government Committees.

Electoral history

Personal life
Her and her husband, Kong, have two children. She resides in St. Paul.

References

External links

 Official House of Representatives website
 Official campaign website

1970s births
Living people
Democratic Party members of the Minnesota House of Representatives
21st-century American politicians
21st-century American women politicians
Women state legislators in Minnesota
American politicians of Hmong descent
Asian-American people in Minnesota politics